This is a list of aircraft in alphabetical order beginning with 'X'.

X

XADRI
(Xi'an Aviation Design & Research Institute)
 Small Eagle 100<ref name=Gordonchina>{{cite book|last=Gordon|first=Yefim|title=Chinese Aircraft:Chinas aviation industry since 1951|year=2008|publisher=Hikoki Publications|location=Manchester|isbn=9 781902 109046|author2=Dmitry Komissarov}}</ref>

 Xausa 
(Reanato Xausa)
 Xausa X-001

 XCOR 
(XCOR Aerospace, Mojave, California)
 XCOR EZ-Rocket
 XCOR Mark-I X-Racer

 Xi'an 
(Xi'an Aircraft Industrial Corporation)
 Xian H-6
 Xian H-8
 Xian H-20
 Xian KJ-600
 Xian JH-7
 Xian JZY-01
 Xian MA60
 Xian MA600
 Xian Q-6
 Xian Y7
 Xian Y8
 Xian Y14
 Xian Y-20

 Xianyi 
 Xianyi Rosamonde (乐士文 (Rosamonde) or １号 (Aircraft 1).)

XIX GmbH
(Kronbühl, Switzerland)
XIX Art
XIX Form
XIX Inter
XIX Sens
XIX Smile
XIX Top
XMarc
(Marc - Ingegno di Alberto Marchini Sas'')
 XMarc Parrot

Xplorer UltraFlight
(Cape Town, South Africa)
Xplorer Micro80
Xplorer Xflyer
Xplorer XS

XTI
(XTI Aircraft Company)
 XTI TriFan 600

XtremeAir 
 XtremeAir Sbach 300
 XtremeAir Sbach 342
 XtremeAir Sbach X42

X-29 
 X-29 Forward Swept Wing Jet

References

Further reading

External links

 List of aircraft (X)